The First Division 7 December was a division of the Royal Netherlands Army, active from at least 1946 to 2004. It was sent to Indonesia in 1946 to restore "peace, order and security" after the proclamation of Indonesian Independence in 1945.

History
The division was named after the speech of Queen Wilhelmina of the Netherlands in London on 7 December 1942: "I imagine, without prejudice to the government conference's advice, that they will focus on a National Association, which the Netherlands, Indonesia, Suriname and Curaçao will have participated together, while each in itself, its own autonomy in internal affairs and drawing on their own, but together with the will to assist, will represent. It will be difference of treatment based on race or national character have no place, but will only have the personal ability of citizens and the needs of different populations for the decisive policy of the Government."

The division was withdrawn from the East Indies in 1949–1950 and spent the remainder of the Cold War as part of NATO Northern Army Group's I (Netherlands) Corps as a deterrent against a Soviet attack on West Germany. In 1985, it had its headquarters at Schaarsbergen, and divisional troops included the 102nd Reconnaissance Battalion (maintained through the Dutch mobilisation system RIM) at Hoogland. The 11th Mechanised Brigade included the 12th and 48th Mechanised Battalions, the 101st Tank Battalion, and the 11th Field Artillery Battalion. The 12th Mechanised Brigade was headquartered at Nunspeet and the 13th Armoured Brigade was at Oirschot.

After the end of the Cold War, it became part of the I. German/Dutch Corps for a period. The division was disbanded on 1 January 2004 and the title of '7 December' was transferred to the 11 Luchtmobiele Brigade (11th Airmobile Brigade).

Divisional Organization 1989 

 1e Divisie "7 December" (Mechanized), Arnhem, NL
 Staff and Staff Company, Arnhem
 102nd Reconnaissance Battalion "Huzaren  van Boreel", Amersfoort (18 x Leopard 1V, 48 x M113-Command & Reconnaissance)
 11e Pantserinfanteriebrigade, Arnhem, NL
 Staff and Staff Company, Arnhem
 101st Pantser Battalion "Regiment Huzaren Prins Alexander", Soesterberg (61 x Leopard 1V, 12 x YPR-765)
 12th Pantserinfanterie Battalion "Garde Regiment Jagers", Arnhem (70 x YPR-765, 16 x YPR-765 PRAT)
 48th Pantserinfanterie Battalion "Regiment van Heutsz", 's-Hertogenbosch (70 x YPR-765, 16 x YPR-765 PRAT)
 11th Horse Artillery Battalion "Gele Rijders", Arnhem (20 x M109A3)
 11th Armored Anti-Tank Company, Ermelo (AIFV|YPR-765 PRAT)
 11th Armored Engineer Company, Ermelo
 11th Brigade Supply Company, Stroe
 11th Brigade Maintenance Company, Arnhem
 11th Brigade Medical Company, Stroe
 12e Pantserinfanteriebrigade, Vierhouten, NL
 Staff and Staff Company, Vierhouten
 59th Pantser Battalion "Regiment Huzaren Prins Oranje", 't Harde (61 x Leopard 1V, 12 x YPR-765)
 11th Pantserinfanterie Battalion "Garde Regiment Grenadiers", Arnhem (70 x YPR-765, 16 x YPR-765 PRAT)
 13th Pantserinfanterie Battalion "Garde Fusiliers Princess Irene", Schalkhaar (70 x YPR-765, 16 x YPR-765 PRAT)
 14th Field Artillery Battalion (Reserve), Vierhouten (20 x M109A3)
 12th Armored Anti-Tank Company, Vierhouten (YPR-765 PRAT)
 12th Armored Engineer Company, Vierhouten
 13th Brigade Supply Company, Vierhouten
 12th Brigade Maintenance Company, Uddel
 12th Brigade Medical Company, Vierhouten
 13e Pantserbrigade, Oirschot, NL
 Staff and Staff Company, Oirschot
 11th Pantser Battalion "Huzaren van Sytzama", Oirschot (52 x Leopard 1V, 12 YPR-765)
 49th Pantser Battalion (Reserve) "Huzaren van Sytzama", Oirschot (52 x Leopard 1V, 12 x YPR-765)
 17th Pantserinfanterie Battalion "Regiment Infanterie Chasse", Oirschot (70 x YPR-765, 16 x YPR-765 PRAT)
 12th Field Artillery Battalion, Oirschot (20 x M109A3)
 13th Armored Engineer Company, Oirschot
 12th Brigade Supply Company, Oirschot
 13th Brigade Maintenance Company, Oirschot
 13th Brigade Medical Company, Oirschot

References

Sources
 Alfred van Sprang Wij werden geroepen : de geschiedenis van de 7 December Divisie, met zweten en zwoegen geschreven door twintigduizend Nederlandse mannen (1949)
 Herinneringsalbum 1e infanterie brigadegroep C Divisie "7 December" 1e deel 1 September 1946 - 1 mrt. 1947, 2e deel mrt. 1947 - sept 1947, 3e deel sept. 1947 - mrt. 1948 en 4e deel 1 mrt. 1948 – Demobilisatie. Uitgegeven door A. W. Sijthoff's uitgeversmij N.V. te Leiden
 Arthur ten Cate De laatste divisie : de geschiedenis van 1 Divisie '7 December' na de val van de Muur 1989-2004 (2004)

External links

 Blog Indonesië 1947 - 1950
 7 December Divisie in Nederlands-Indië van 1946-1950
 Fusie tussen het Duitse en Nederlandse leger 

Army units and formations of the Netherlands
Indonesian National Revolution
Military units and formations established in 1946
Military units and formations disestablished in 2004